Olha Boychenko (born 6 January 1989) is a Ukrainian football midfielder, who played for Zhytlobud-1 Kharkiv in the Ukrainian Women's League. She had previously played for Naftokhimik Kalush and Lehenda Chernihiv in the Ukrainian League., and for Zvezda Perm in the Russian Championship. She is a member of the Ukrainian national team, and took part in the 2009 European Championship.

International goals

Honours
Lehenda Chernihiv
 Ukrainian Women's League (2): 2009, 2010
 Women's Cup: (2) 2008, 2010

References

1989 births
Living people
Footballers from Odesa
Ukrainian women's footballers
Women's association football midfielders
WFC Lehenda-ShVSM Chernihiv players
WFC Yuzhanka Kherson players
WFC Naftokhimik Kalush players
Zvezda 2005 Perm players
WFC Rossiyanka players
Ryazan-VDV players
WFC Zhytlobud-1 Kharkiv players
Ukraine women's international footballers
Ukrainian expatriate women's footballers
Ukrainian expatriate sportspeople in Russia
Expatriate women's footballers in Russia
Ukrainian expatriate sportspeople in Armenia
Expatriate footballers in Armenia